Cahir railway station serves the town of Cahir, County Tipperary in Ireland.

It has a weekday passenger service of two trains to Limerick Junction and two to Waterford. There is no Sunday service. Until 19 January 2013 (inclusive) there were three trains each way. However, the late-morning Waterford to Limerick Junction and early-afternoon Limerick Junction to Waterford trains are now discontinued.

Passengers should change at Limerick Junction for connections to Limerick, Cork, Tralee, Galway and Dublin.

The station is unstaffed and the platform is accessible via a ramp.

History

The station opened on 1 May 1852.

See also
 List of railway stations in Ireland

References

External links
Irish Rail Cahir Station Website
National Inventory of Industrial Heritage - Cahir Station
South Tipperary Rail & Bus Website

Iarnród Éireann stations in County Tipperary
Railway stations opened in 1852
Cahir
1852 establishments in Ireland
Railway stations in the Republic of Ireland opened in 1852